Admiral Davis may refer to:

Arthur C. Davis (1893–1965), U.S. Navy admiral
Charles Henry Davis (1807–1877), U.S. Navy rear admiral
Donald C. Davis (1921–1998), U.S. Navy admiral
Edward H.M. Davis (1846–1929), British Royal Navy admiral
George W. Davis VI (born 1938), U.S. Navy rear admiral
Glenn B. Davis (1892–1984), U.S. Navy vice admiral
John L. Davis (1825–1889), U.S. Navy rear admiral
Walter J. Davis Jr. (born 1936), U.S. Navy vice admiral
William Davis (Royal Navy officer) (1901–1987), British Royal Navy admiral
William V. Davis (1902–1981), U.S. Navy vice admiral